The 2011–12 Korfball Europa Cup is the main korfball competition for clubs in Europe played in the season 2011-2012.

First round
The first round took place in the weekend of 23–25 September 2011 in Prievidza (Slovakia)

Final round
The final round is held in Warsaw, Poland from 17 to 21 January 2012. With the seeded champions of Netherlands, Belgium, Portugal, Czech Republic, Russia, England, Catalonia, Germany and host country Poland. As well as the 3 best teams in the first round.

 Qualified teams 

   TOP
   Boeckenberg
   Benfica
   Kolín
   Orel
   Trojans
   Vallparadís
   Adler Rauxel
   Prievidza Dolphins
   Bonson
   Ankara Üniversitesi
   Megasports Warszawa

Competition

9th-12th places

5th-8th places

Title

Final standings

External links
Europa Cup 2012 - First round (IKF)
Europa Cup 2012 - Final round (IKF)

Korfball European Cup
Korfball Europa Cup
Korfball Europa Cup